Frédéric Vitoux (born 19 August 1944) is a French writer and journalist.

He is known as a novelist, biographer and literary columnist. His father was a journalist. He was elected at the Académie Française in 2001. In 2010, he won the Édouard Drumont literary prize for his novel Grand Hotel Nelson.

Bibliography
1973  Louis-Ferdinand Céline, Misère et parole  (Éditions Gallimard)
1973  Cartes postales  (Gallimard)
1976  Les Cercles de l'orage  (Grasset)
1976  Bébert, le chat de Louis-Ferdinand Céline  (Grasset)
1978  Yedda jusqu'à la fin  (Grasset)
1978  Céline  (Belfond) 
1979  Un amour de chat  (Balland)
1981  Mes îles Saint-Louis  (Le Chêne)
1982  Gioacchino Rossini  (Le Seuil)
1983  Fin de saison au Palazzo Pedrotti  (Le Seuil)
1985  La Nartelle  (Le Seuil)
1986  Il me semble désormais que Roger est en Italie  (Actes-Sud)
1987  Riviera  (Le Seuil)
1988  La Vie de Céline  (Grasset)
1990  Sérénissime  (Le Seuil)
1990  L'Art de vivre à Venise  (Flammarion)
1992  Charles et Camille  (Le Seuil)
1993  Paris vu du Louvre  (A. Biro)
1994  La Comédie de Terracina  (Le Seuil)
1996  Deux femmes  (Le Seuil)
1998  Esther et le diplomate  (Le Seuil)
2000  L'ami de mon père  (Le Seuil)
2001  Le Var pluriel et singulier  (Équinoxe)
2003  Des dahlias rouge et mauve  (Le Seuil)
2004  Villa Sémiramis  (Le Seuil)
2005  Le roman de Figaro  (Fayard)

References

External links
  L'Académie française

1944 births
Living people
People from Loiret
20th-century French novelists
21st-century French novelists
French literary critics
French biographers
Members of the Académie Française
Grand Prix du roman de l'Académie française winners
Prix Valery Larbaud winners
French male novelists
20th-century biographers
Officiers of the Ordre des Arts et des Lettres
Officiers of the Légion d'honneur
Officers of the Order of Cultural Merit (Monaco)
Prix Goncourt de la Biographie winners
20th-century French male writers
21st-century French male writers
French male non-fiction writers
Male biographers